This article covers the 2008 AFL season results for the Brisbane Lions.

Player Changes

In

Out

Results

NAB Cup

Regular season

Home and away season

Round 1 (Easter & Season Launch)

Round 2

Round 3 (Rivalry Round)

Round 4

Round 5

Round 6 (Anzac Day)

Round 7

Round 8

Round 9

Round 10

Round 11 (Queen's Birthday)

Round 12

Round 13

Round 14 (Split Round)

Round 15

Round 16

Round 17

Round 18

Round 19

Round 20

Round 21

Round 22 

All times are local.

External links 
 Official Website of the Brisbane Lions Football Club
 Official Website of the Australian Football League 

Brisbane Lions
2008
Brisbane Lions